Epidendrum pseudepidendrum  (the "False Epidendrum Epidendrum") is a species of orchid native to Costa Rica and Panama.  The upright canes, which can reach 5 ft., bear paniculate inflorescences which can re-bloom for several years.  According to Reichenbach, the strange name is the result of first being named Pseudepidendrum spectabile, before being moved to Epidendrum.

The species E. xanthoianthinum Hágsater (1993) was first described as a gold variety of this species, with the name E. pseudepidendrum var. auratum Rchb.f. (1885).

Images

References and external links

H. G. Reichenbach "ORCHIDES" in Dr. Carl Müller, Walpers Annales Botanices Systematicae 6(1861)414, Berlin.

pseudepidendrum